The Raj Hamsa Voyager is an Indian ultralight trike, designed and produced by Raj Hamsa Ultralights since the 1990s. The aircraft is supplied as a complete ready-to-fly-aircraft.

Design and development
It features a cable-braced hang glider-style high-wing, weight-shift controls, a two-seats-in-tandem open cockpit without a cockpit fairing, tricycle landing gear with optional wheel pants and a single engine in pusher configuration.

The aircraft is made from bolted-together aluminum tubing, with its double surface Raj Hamsa-made wing covered in Dacron sailcloth. Its  span wing is supported by a single tube-type aerodynamically faired kingpost and uses an "A" frame weight-shift control bar. The wing is of a smaller area and faster design than the Clipper's wing and is mounted lower on a shorter mast. The landing gear has hydraulic suspension and large diameter wheels, to permit rough field operations. The powerplant is a twin cylinder, air-cooled, two-stroke, dual-ignition  Rotax 503 engine or the four cylinder, air-cooled, four-stroke, dual-ignition  Jabiru 2200 engine.

Specifications (Voyager)

References

External links

1990s Indian sport aircraft
1990s Indian ultralight aircraft
Single-engined pusher aircraft
Ultralight trikes